First BanCorp is a publicly owned financial holding company located in San Juan, Puerto Rico.

History
FirstBank was the first Savings & Loan institution established in Puerto Rico with a capital of $200,000 in 1948. Today, the company provides financial services for retail, commercial and institutional clients in Puerto Rico, US Virgin Islands, British Virgin Islands and Florida. First BanCorp is headquartered in San Juan, Puerto Rico and is ranked the 669th and 1537th Largest Company In The World in Forbes magazine by Total Assets and Profits. On 2006 it had over $18.8 billion in assets.

As of May, 2016, First owed $124.97 million to the US government Troubled Asset Relief Program.

In October 2019, FirstBank announced their intention to purchase Banco Santander de Puerto Rico. The transaction was approved by regulators on July 28, 2020 and should be completed by September 1, 2020.

Key leadership
 Mr. Aurelio Aleman-Bermudez 

Chief Exec. Officer, Pres, Director,
 Mr. Orlando Berges-Gonzalez CPA 

Chief Financial Officer and Exec. VP

Direct competition in Puerto Rico
 Popular, Inc. (BPOP) & OFG Bancorp (OFG)

References

External links 
 FirstBank Online

Banks of Puerto Rico
Companies based in San Juan, Puerto Rico
Companies listed on the New York Stock Exchange